This is a list of yearly Great West Conference football standings.

Great West Conference standings

References

Great West Conference
Standings